The Beltzhoover Elementary School in the Beltzhoover neighborhood of Pittsburgh, Pennsylvania, is a building from 1909. It was listed on the National Register of Historic Places in 1986.

References

School buildings on the National Register of Historic Places in Pennsylvania
Neoclassical architecture in Pennsylvania
School buildings completed in 1909
Schools in Pittsburgh
City of Pittsburgh historic designations
Pittsburgh History & Landmarks Foundation Historic Landmarks
National Register of Historic Places in Pittsburgh
1909 establishments in Pennsylvania